Gomareh Lang (also Romanized as Gomāreh Lang; also known as Gomāralang, Gomār Lang, and Gumār-i-Lang) is a village in Sarshiv Rural District, Sarshiv District, Marivan County, Kurdistan Province, Iran. At the 2006 census, its population was 331, in 70 families. The village is populated by Kurds.

References 

Towns and villages in Marivan County
Kurdish settlements in Kurdistan Province